Lu Hao (born 21 June 1967) is a Chinese politician, serving as party branch secretary of Development Research Center of the State Council since June 2022. Previously, he was the head of the Ministry of Natural Resources, and the youngest provincial governor in China, as the Governor of Heilongjiang from 2013 to 2018. Lu has also served as the first secretary of the Communist Youth League, and vice-mayor of Beijing.

Early life
Lu was born in Xi'an, but traces his ancestry to Shanghai (some sources say he was born in Shanghai). His father was a university professor. Lu was an only child. He attended Xi'an No. 85 High School. In high school, Lu played volleyball and was captain of the school team for three years in a row. In school, his favourite subjects were history and politics. He consistently ranked as one of the top three students in his classes.

Lu joined the Chinese Communist Party in 1985 at 18 years of age. Due to his high grades, he was guaranteed entrance to the School of Economics and Management at Peking University. He was soon involved in student politics, and at age 20 was elected the head of the university student union, becoming the first student union president elected by popular vote since the Cultural Revolution. In early 1989, he gained admittance without sitting an exam to pursue graduate studies in economics at Peking University.

While in graduate school, Lu worked under the direction of renowned Chinese economic Li Yining, who also taught Li Keqiang and Li Yuanchao. Lu also worked part-time as assistant to the manager of a wool production plant. By the age of 28, he was promoted general manager of the Beijing Wool Factory, directing the work of some 5,000 employees. While leading the plant, Lu shuttled between Xi'an and Beijing trying to win further business. He streamlined operations and increased revenue, turning the plant into a profit-generating business; the plant would eventually converted into a corporation. In 1998 he was named one of the "Ten Outstanding Youth of Beijing" for his work at the wool factory, and was received by then Premier Zhu Rongji.

Political career
Lu became head of the Zhongguancun Administrative Office in 1999, beginning his career in public administration. The Zhongguancun area of Beijing was known as "China's silicon valley", rich in start-up technology companies. In February 2003, he began working part-time as assistant to the chief executive of the Three Gorges Dam project. In January 2003, Lu was named vice mayor of Beijing, overseeing the city's Industry Work Commission and Economic Commission, overseeing the broad portfolios of state assets supervision, industry, and information technology.

In May 2008, Lu was named First Secretary of the Communist Youth League. He also served ex officio as the president of the China Youth University for Political Sciences. Prior to Lu, various political heavyweights, including former party leaders Hu Yaobang and Hu Jintao, and Premier Li Keqiang, had served in this position. At age 40, Lu became the youngest provincial-ministerial level official in the country.

In 2009, Lu in his capacity as a member of the CPC Central Committee attended the 18th Congress of the Communist Party of Greece and personally met with its leader, Aleka Papariga.

He was appointed acting governor of Heilongjiang on March 25, 2013, replacing Wang Xiankui, who had been promoted to Heilongjiang party chief. Lu was then elected as governor on June 5, 2013, during the second session of the 12th Heilongjiang Provincial People's Congress.

In 2012, Lu became the youngest full member of the 18th Central Committee of the Chinese Communist Party. In 2017 he remained the youngest full member of the 19th Central Committee of the Chinese Communist Party.

In March 2018 he was made Minister of Natural Resources in the central government.

In June 2022, he was appointed party branch secretary of Development Research Center of the State Council, succeeding Ma Jiantang.

References

External links
Peking University article profiling Lu Hao upon his appointment to Heilongjiang governorship, March 2013

1967 births
Living people
Peking University alumni
Governors of Heilongjiang
Politicians from Xi'an
First Secretaries of the Communist Youth League of China
Deputy mayors of Beijing
Ministers of Natural Resources of the People's Republic of China
People's Republic of China politicians from Shaanxi
Chinese Communist Party politicians from Shaanxi